The Habibas islands  are located about 12 km off the Algerian coast, northwest of Oran.  The islands consist of a principal island  1.3 km long surrounded by an archipelago covering a total area of about 40 ha.  The highest point on the Habibas islands reaches 105 m. The islands are of volcanic origin.

The Habibas islands fall under the Bou Zedjar municipality in the Aïn Témouchent Province, Algeria.
There are no permanent population centres, but there is a small jetty, a lighthouse (built in 1879) and a few small buildings. The islands make up the Iles Habibas Marine Nature Reserve.

By the end of 2006, a project to rehabilitate and maintain the island was to commence, backed by Algerian and French funding. The stated objective was to support the local ecosystem.

See also
List of lighthouses in Algeria

References 

Islands of Africa
Islands of Algeria
Lighthouses in Algeria